DCCA may refer to:
Diameter Credit-Control Application
DCC Alliance, a now-defunct Debian-based industry consortium
Delaware Center for the Contemporary Arts, a museum in Wilmington, Delaware.
Dichloroisocyanuric acid